Son Seong-yoon (Korean: 손성윤, born Kim Min-jung on 24 August 1984) is a South Korean actress. She is alumni of Kyonggi University, Department of Multimedia and Imaging. She made her acting debut in 2006, since then, she has appeared in number of films and television series. She is known for her roles in Touch Your Heart (2019) and Once Again (2020). She has acted in two films: The Wrath (2018) and The Prisoner (2020). In 2021 she appeared in TV series Bossam: Steal the Fate and  daily drama Love Twist.

Career
Son Seong-yoon debuted in TV series with 2006 KBS historical drama Hwang Jini.

Son appeared in tvN's Ugly Miss Young-ae Season 5 (2009), MBC's Pasta (2010). In 2011 she was cast in My Princess, Scent of a Woman and Bravo, My Love!

In 2015 she appeared in Divorce Lawyer in Love and KBS Drama Special  season 6, episode 4 "Funny Woman". Later She appeared in TV series such as:  Because This Is My First Life (2017) and What's Wrong with Secretary Kim (2018). In 2019 she appeared in Touch Your Heart as public prosecutor. In 2020, she played the role of Yoo Bo-young in KBS2 TV weekend drama Once Again, the Yoon Gyu-jin's (Lee Sang-yeob) first love.

On August 4, 2020 she signed an exclusive contract with Woongbin ENS.

In 2021, Son appeared in Bossam: Steal the Fate, My Roommate Is a Gumiho and KBS daily drama Love Twist as Kang Yoon-ah, one of the main cast.

Filmography

Films

Television series

References

External links

 
 Son Seong-yoon on Daum 

21st-century South Korean actresses
South Korean film actresses
South Korean television actresses
Living people
People from Seoul
Actresses from Seoul
1984 births
Kyonggi University alumni